Otterup Bold- & Idrætsklub (commonly known as Otterup B&IK), is an association football club based in the town of Otterup, Funen, Denmark, that competes in the Denmark Series, the fourth tier of the Danish football league system. Founded in 1913, it is also known by its shortened name "OB&IK" and affiliated to the local DBU Funen association. The team plays its home matches at Otterup Stadium, where it has been based since the 1950s and has a capacity of 1,200.

External links
 Official site

Football clubs in Denmark
1913 establishments in Denmark
Sport in Funen